P. S. Nataraja Pillai (March 1891  1966) was an Indian politician, freedom fighter and Member of Parliament during the 3rd Lok Sabha elections held in 1962. He served as the Adviser to the Travancore government at Delhi in 1948 and finance minister of the Travancore-Cochin state from 1954 to 1955.

Life and background
P. S. Nataraja was born in the Alappuzha district of Kerala in March 1891. He was originally elected as a Member of Parliament independently in 1962; later, he established his political associations with the Congress, Indian Socialist Party and the Praja Socialist Party.

Before the Independence of India, he was a member of the Travancore Constitution Reforms Committee in 1946. During his career, he was a member of the Travancore Manigam Karam Committee from 1952 to 1953, the Unemployment Committee in 1956, and the Reforms Committee (Kerala) from 1958 to 1959. Besides remaining a member in government-led committees, it was in 1960 when Nataraja was appointed as the Chairman of the High Level Sales Tax Enquiry Committee for a period of one year.

In 1948, one year after independence, Nataraja was elected as a member of the Constituent Assembly until 1950; later, he served in Travancore-Cochin's Legislative Assembly from 1951 to 1957. In 1962, Nataraja contested the parliamentary elections from the Thiruvananthapuram constituency (also known as "Trivandrum") and was elected as a Member of Parliament.

Personal life 
Nataraja was married to Komalam and he had seven daughters and three sons. Nataraja was the son of an Indian scholar Manonmaniam P. Sundaram Pillai, known professionally as Professor Manonmaniam Sundaram Pillai, who was an educator in a college located in Kerala.

Controversies
In 2017, the Chief Minister of Kerala Pinarayi Vijayan claimed to have made objectionable remarks about P. S. Nataraja Pillai. The Minister later acknowledged the remarks citing that he never meant to demean a particular person but only some Pillai families. Vijayan clarified the controversies citing that he didn't even remember Nataraja's name. The opposition party Indian National Congress demanded the resignation of the Kerala CM over his remarks which landed him in a wide controversy.

References 

1891 births
1966 deaths
India MPs 1962–1967
19th-century Indian politicians
People from Kerala
Indian independence activists
People from Alappuzha district
Indian politicians